Rodney James Delmonico (born May 14, 1958) is an American baseball coach. He served as head coach of the Tennessee Volunteers of the University of Tennessee from 1990 through 2007, and for the Netherlands national baseball team in the 2009 World Baseball Classic.

Early life
Born in Wilmington, North Carolina, Delmonico graduated from New Hanover High School in 1976 and Liberty University in 1980 with a bachelor's degree in physical education.  He lettered in baseball and soccer.  He holds a master's degree from Clemson University in education administration.

Career
Delmonico was Assistant Coach at Gloucester County College in 1980, Graduate Assistant Coach at Clemson from 1981–83, and Assistant Coach at Florida State University from 1984-89.

Delmonico was head coach of the Tennessee Volunteers baseball team from 1990 until 2007, when he was released from his contract.  He returned to Florida State as a volunteer assistant coach, then joined Florida International University as an assistant coach.  He was named manager of the Netherlands national baseball team and managed the team in the 2009 World Baseball Classic. Was known around NCAAB as one of the most influential hitting gurus of the SEC.

Personal life
Delmonico is divorced from Barbara Vanaman of Williamstown, New Jersey. They have three sons: Tony, Joey and Nicky. Tony played for his father at Tennessee and played in the Los Angeles Dodgers organization. Nicky played in Major League Baseball for the Chicago White Sox.

References

External links
Online Hitting Academy: Rod Delmonico Bio
UT Bio

1958 births
Living people
Tennessee Volunteers baseball coaches
Liberty Flames baseball players
Clemson University alumni
Rowan Roadrunners baseball coaches
Clemson Tigers baseball coaches
Florida State Seminoles baseball coaches
FIU Panthers baseball coaches
Liberty Flames men's soccer players
Association footballers not categorized by position
New Hanover High School alumni
Association football players not categorized by nationality
Baseball coaches from North Carolina